The Great Wall Ballad is a Chinese patriotic song written in 1937 by Pao Maonong and Liu Xue'an after the Marco Polo Bridge Incident. The song became extremely popular among both the Communist and Nationalist Chinese, and quickly rose to prominence among the Chinese Diaspora. Today, the Great Wall Ballad is one of the most popular Chinese patriotic songs in both Taiwan and Mainland China, largely due to its apolitical lyrics and folk-style melody. The song has been adapted numerous times across its history, and is sometimes seen as the de facto anthem of the Chinese diaspora.

History
The Great Wall Ballad was written to appear as a musical number in the 1937 Huayi Film Company production Kanshan Wanli. However, after the Japanese annexation of Shanghai, production on the film was ceased. After fleeing to Northern China, one of the lead producers of the film, Lu Xuebiao, published the script and music of Kanshan Wanli in Warsong Magazine, a popular Chinese resistance publication. The Great Wall Ballad became a popular melody among the readers, and it was disseminated by a large number of anti-Japanese propagandists across China. As the war progressed, the song became increasingly well known, and was performed internationally by Zhou Xiaoyian, an acclaimed Chinese choral singer, alongside the remainder of the soundtrack to Kanshan Wanli. These international performances made the Great Wall Ballad a favourite among the Chinese diaspora, and it remains a well-known piece among diaspora communities globally.

In 1957, Liu Xue'an was denounced by the Communist Party of China as a rightist, and his works, including the Great Wall Ballad, were banned for 22 years. During this period, the song continued to increase in popularity in Taiwan and Hong Kong, and by the time that ban was lifted in 1979, it had become well-established across the Sinosphere. The song remains popular in both Mainland China and Taiwan to this day, and was featured during the Chinese bid to host the 2022 Winter Olympics.

Lyrics

See also
"Ode to the Motherland"
"Ode to the Republic of China"
"The East Is Red (song)"
"The Plum Blossom"

References

Chinese patriotic songs
1937 songs